Imad Hawari (b. 17 may   Arabic: عماد هواري) is a Lebanese journalist who works for the Arabica channel.

Early life
Born in Beirut, Imad received his degree in media and journalism from Beirut University.

Work

TV Shows
TV Shows:
Arabica News  2011 till january 2017
آخر الأخبار  2002–2010 ،Rotana Music
مزازيك 2008راديو روتانا دلتا
بيروت بالليل ،Radio Rotana Delta، 2010
غنيلي غنية، Lebanon TV
Radio Broadcasts :
 Radio Rotana Lebanon
 Radio Rotana Delta
 Raadio El Noujoum

In Music
سجل أغنية "ما بقدر" من كلمات أحمد ماضي وألحان هيثم زياد year 2004
سجل أغنية "انت القمر" year 2016

In Acting
Films:
الجبال حين تنهار 2002
ويزول الخطر 2001
سكرتيرة بابا   2000
حب تحت الحراسة 1998
كلاكيت آخر – Directed by karim diae el din
عيون ثريا – Directed by foud sharaf el din
يوم للحياة – Directed by mohamad el nakli
Episodes:
 حارة برجوان – Directed by Ahmad Sakr
 الجبال حين تنهار – Directed by Youssef Sharafeldin
 الميزان – Directed by Waad Alama
 العاصفة تهب مرتين – Directed by Milad Al Hashem
 كومبارس – Directed by Gaby Saad
 سكريتيرة بابا – Directed by Gaby Saad
 في حضرة الغياب – 2008 – Directed by Najdat Ismail Anzor
 حب تحت الحراسة – Directed by Mohammad Al Nakli
 يا غافل الك الله – Directed by Gaby Saad 
 كذبة بيضاء – 2010 – Directed by Lilliane Bustany
 قلب المدينة – Directed by Tarek Al Nahri
 اللقاء الآخر – 2008 – Directed by Milad Al Hashem
 دموع العدالة – 2000  – Directed by Wisal Naama
 شكتني ردينة – 1996 – Directed by Genevieve Atallah
 العصفورة – 1995 – Directed by Fouad Sharafeldin
Theatre Plays:
 مس بيروت – Directed by Georges Hanna
 نينجا ترتلز – Directed by Tony Ghattas
 الاسطورة "الشحرورة صباح" – Directed by Fady Lebnen
 Plays واحد لمون والتاني مجنون

In Cinema
المرأة والمال – 1996 – Directed by Samir Al Ghussaini (مع ملكة جمال لبنان جويل بحلق)
الحب نصيب – Directed by Hasan Al Saifi
لمن يغني الحب 1991

References

Links
http://m.elcinema.com/person/pr1081166/
http://mobile.farfesh.com/Read.Art.asp?Id=88276 
http://bisara7a.com/tag/عماد-هواري/
http://elaph.com/ElaphWeb/Entertainment/2008/6/338237.htm
http://www.bostah.com/عماد-هواري-عصابات-الإنتاج-تتحكم-بالدراما.htm

1979 births
Living people
Lebanese journalists